Jay Philip Goede (born November 2, 1963) is an American actor best known for his stage roles on Broadway in New York City.

Career
Goede appeared on Broadway in the original productions of Angels in America (1993) Sex and Longing (opposite Sigourney Weaver) (1995) A Year with Frog and Toad (2003),  and with Valerie Harper in Looped (2009). Other stage credits include the Broadway production of The Play's the Thing (1995),  the off-Broadway production of The Most Fabulous Story Ever Told (1998), Miracle Brothers (2005) and the 1999 national tour of Cabaret. In 2006, Goede played the title character in the musical How the Grinch Stole Christmas! at the Old Globe in San Diego, California.

Goede has played several minor roles on television. He is also credited (under the name Philip Bartlett)  as the voice of Mewtwo in the English dub of Pokémon: The First Movie. However, his real name is given in the brochure for Pokémon Live! where he did the vocals for Mewtwo's surprise cameo.

Education
Goede received a Bachelor of Fine Arts from the University of Minnesota. He then earned a Master in Fine Arts in 1991 from the Yale School of Drama, where he studied with acting teacher Earle Gister among others.

Teaching
Goede has been a visiting instructor at the University of Minnesota (2006), the University of Miami (2009), and the Art Institute of Fort Lauderdale.

References

External links
www.jaygoede.com
Jay Goede at BroadwayWorld.com

1963 births
American male voice actors
People from Scott County, Minnesota
University of Minnesota alumni
Living people
21st-century American politicians
People from Caledonia, Minnesota
Yale School of Drama alumni